Tungsten(IV) telluride (WTe2) is an inorganic semimetallic chemical compound. In October 2014, tungsten ditelluride was discovered to exhibit an extremely large magnetoresistance: 13 million percent resistance increase in a magnetic field of 60 Tesla at 0.5 Kelvin.  The resistance is proportional to the square of the magnetic field and shows no saturation. This may be due to the material being the first example of a compensated semimetal, in which the number of mobile holes is the same as the number of electrons. Tungsten ditelluride has layered structure, similar to many other transition metal dichalcogenides, but its layers are so distorted that the honeycomb lattice many of them have in common is in WTe2 hard to recognize. The tungsten atoms instead form zigzag chains, which are thought to behave as one-dimensional conductors. Unlike electrons in other two dimensional semiconductors, the electrons in WTe2 can easily move between the layers.

When subjected to pressure, the magnetoresistance effect in WTe2 is reduced. Above the pressure of 10.5 GPa magnetoresistance disappears and the material becomes a superconductor.  At 13.0 GPa the transition to superconductivity happens below 6.5 K.

WTe2 was predicted to be a Weyl semimetal and, in particular, to be the first example of a Type II Weyl semimetal, where the Weyl nodes exist at the intersection of the electron and hole pockets.

It has also been reported that terahertz-frequency light pulses can switch the crystal structure of WTe2 between orthorhombic and monoclinic by altering the material's atomic lattice.

Tungsten ditelluride can be exfoliated into thin sheets down to single layers. Monolayer WTe2 was initially predicted to remain a Weyl semimetal in the 1T' crystal phase. It was later shown with transport measurements that, below 50K, a single layer of WTe2 instead acts like an insulator but with an offset current independent of doping by a local electrostatic gate. When using a contact geometry that shorted out conduction along the device edges, this offset current vanished, demonstrating that this nearly quantized conduction was localized to the edge—behavior consistent with monolayer WTe2 being a two-dimensional topological insulator. Identical measurements with two- and three-layer thick samples showed the expected semimetallic response. Subsequent studies using other techniques have been consistent with the transport results, including those using angle-resolved photoemission spectroscopy and microwave-impedance microscopy. Monolayer WTe2 has also been observed to superconduct at moderate doping, with a critical temperature tunable by doping level.

Two- and three-layer thick WTe2 have also been observed to be polar metals, simultaneously hosting metallic behavior and switchable electric polarization. The polarization was theorized to originate from vertical charge transfer between the layers, which is switched by interlayer sliding.

References

Tellurides
Tungsten compounds
Transition metal dichalcogenides
Monolayers